Persekabtas Tasikmalaya is a Indonesian association football team based in Tasikmalaya, West Java which was formed on June 1, 2018 and approved in the Asprov PSSI West Java Annual Congress  on April 27, 2019. They currently compete in the Liga 3.

Persekabtas Tasikmalaya has been under the auspices of Askab PSSI Tasikmalaya Regency together with Persitas Tasikmalaya.

Entitled to participate in Liga 3, Persekabtas Tasikmalaya turned out to be a merger club from Fearless FC Bandung which is owned by the Secretary General of Asprov PSSI Jabar Dedi Permana who comes from Tasikmalaya Regency.

References

Tasikmalaya Regency
Defunct football clubs in Indonesia
Football clubs in West Java
Association football clubs established in 2018
2018 establishments in Indonesia
Association football clubs disestablished in 2022
2022 disestablishments in Indonesia